Pallini is a station located in the median strip of the Attiki Odos motorway west of the suburb of Pallini in Athens, East Attica. This station first opened to Athens Suburban Railway trains on 30 July 2004, with Athens Metro services calling at this station from September 2006.

The station's platforms have two levels, with each end serving trains from either the Athens Metro or the Suburban Railway: Suburban Railway trains stop at the northern end while Athens Metro Line 3 trains stop at the southern end. , the station is served by two Suburban Railway trains per hour to the airport, one or two to Ano Liosia and one to Pireaus.

Services

Since 27 September 2022, the following weekday services call at this station:

Station layout

References

External links
 Pallini railway station - National Railway Network Greek Travel Pages

Athens Metro stations
Transport in East Attica
Railway stations in Attica
Railway stations opened in 2004
Buildings and structures in East Attica
Railway stations in highway medians
2004 establishments in Greece